Campos do Jordão is a municipality in the state of São Paulo in southeastern Brazil. It is part of the Metropolitan Region of Vale do Paraíba e Litoral Norte.

There are numerous outdoor activities for tourists and winter residents.  These include hiking, mountain climbing, treetop cable swings (arborismo), horseback riding, and ATV and motorbike riding. July, of winter season vacations, sees an enormous influx of visitors (more than quadrupling the city's population), due in part to the winter festival of classical music.

Its attractions throughout the year include German, Swiss and Italian cuisine restaurants, bars, and a cable car. There are many pousadas (inns) and chalets. Also, in order to cater to the large number of visitors, several bars, lounges, discos and clubs open during the winter months.

Demography

Total Population: 51,454
 Population Density (inhabitants/km2): 152.86
 Infant Mortality (0 to one year old) (per one thousand): 8.52
 Life Expectancy (years): 75.73
 Total Fertility Rate (Children per Woman): 2.18
 Literacy Rate: 92.28%
 Human Development Index (IHDI): 0.820
 IHDI-M Income: 0.763
 IHDI-M Life Expectancy: 0.846
 IHDI-M Education: 0.851

(Source: IPEADATA)

Economy
The city's economy is based mainly on tourism; due to its location at high elevation in the Mantiqueira mountains, and traditional European-style architecture. Buildings are mostly vernacular architecture from German, Swiss, or Italian models. Many of the wealthiest residents in the state of São Paulo have winter country houses here.

Despite the high income of many visitors, the HDI (0.820 in 2004) of Campos do Jordão is not very high because the owners of the houses in the best neighbourhoods are not regular inhabitants; these houses are used only during the holidays. The city can be reached from São Paulo mainly by road through the Rodovia Floriano Rodrigues Pinheiro. There is also a picturesque railroad from Pindamonhangaba, used mostly by tourists. At the end of the main road going through Campos do Jordão, there is a state park called Horto Florestal.

Geography
The municipality contains the  Campos do Jordão State Park, created in 1941.
It contains the  Mananciais de Campos do Jordão State Park, created in 1993 to protect the water supply of the municipal seat.
It also contains the  Campos do Jordão Environmental Protection Area, created in 1984.

The Mantiqueira Mountains provide unique panoramic views, and the municipality's region still has undeveloped old growth Atlantic Forest habitat.  The native Brazilian Paraná pine (Araucaria angustifolia) is found here.

A former state governor had a winter residence in the city, the Boa Vista Palace, which is now a museum in the city.

The city is located in the northeastern side of the State of São Paulo, bordering Minas Gerais in the north. Campos do Jordão is at a distance of 180 km (112 miles) from the City of São Paulo, 334 km (208 miles) from the City of Rio de Janeiro, and 486 km (302 miles) from Belo Horizonte.

Campos do Jordão is located on a crystalline plateau where the High Felds are located (in Portuguese: Altos Campos) formed from the quaternary, increasing the geomorphological risks with the increase of urbanization and seen inadequate occupations as in straight slopes. These areas may be at risk of landslide. The municipality has rounded topos and amphitheaters where organic clay is found due to erosive processes and due to this constitution its characteristic is the concentration of water.

Climate

Campos do Jordão features a subtropical highland climate/mesothermal but technically ever moist (Köppen: Cfb), although other sources define it as Cwb, which is more common for its tropical location, except for the definition of a dry season, there is no greater difference in climate modeling of the plateau climates. According to a detailed study on the climate classifications it is affirmed that the Cwb is more frequent, but that Cfb appears more in the average in spatial distribution. In general, is characterized with warm to cool summers (with abundant precipitation during the period) and mild winters but cold for São Paulo state. Although at a higher elevation than the higher portions than Santa Catarina, the latitude compensates for such a difference by giving winters a little warmer and with unknown snow over a long period associated with the drier mid-year air. As it is a montane vegetation and with mild temperatures, trees like Araucaria augustifolia is part of the ecosystem of the highest part of the Mantiqueira Mountains. The annual sweating evaporation is one of the smallest of the cities of São Paulo, which can tend to water deficiencies in the driest months.

The average annual precipitation is approximately 1850 mm annually, concentrated in December and January. The average annual compensated temperature is 14.5 °C (although there are cooler cities, the cooler weather tends to last longer by averaging less than municipalities like Curitiba, Lages or Canela), falling to below zero in winter at the same time at a few degrees Celsius in the Paraíba Valley, with a thermal sensation that may be even lower, but there may be years with temperatures above freezing as in 1999. As previously said even with high altitude latitude together is not enough for snowfall and therefore, the occurrence of snow in the city is rare, having been recorded in years as 1928, 1942, 1947 and 1966, four records at intervals of two decades that seems to be discontinued so far, in addition the dates are not consensual and INMET installed since 1944 did not record any occurrence of flakes.

According to data from the National Institute of Meteorology (INMET), since 1961 the absolute minimum temperature recorded in Campos do Jordão from -7.2 °C on June 6, 1988. For the Forecast Center (CPTEC) the winter of this year was the most rigorous of the records, for comparison between 2008 and 2018 the lowest temperature was only -3.8 °C, being urbanization is a factor of softer conditions Outside this period there are still other unofficial low temperature records even lower, as -7.4 °C on 26 June 1918, -8 °C on 25 July 1923 and -8.7 °C in July 1926. The absolute maximum in the same period was 30.5 °C on September 17, 1961. In other two occasions temperatures reached 30 °C, being on September 21, 1961 and October 14, 1963, with only three available data available. Cooler temperatures are more common in June and July, but during the afternoon they will be above freezing, often cool. Much of September and April is composed of pleasant days, hot days with 30 °C or more are almost null.

The largest accumulated precipitation in 24 hours was 146.7 mm on March 10, 1965. Other large accumulations were 129.5 mm on October 14, 1995, 121.1 mm on January 24, 1964, 118.2 mm on March 8, 1966, 111.4 mm on December 24, 1971, 108.4 mm on May 25, 2005, 106.4 mm on December 14, 1971, 104.2 mm on December 2, 1963, 102.8 mm on November 20, 1971 and 101.2 mm on December 22, 1966. The month of greatest precipitation was December 1971, when 606.6 mm were recorded. Coincidentally the most auspicious day of average rainfall is Christmas with a 75% chance of net precipitation, remaining high between December and January. It is also understood that 75% of the annual rainfall is between spring and summer. The altitude variation and the presence of valleys makes differences in the total amount in the municipality, and the humidity decreases towards the interior of the plateau.

The seasonal variation of cloudiness is remarkable. The most susceptible time for sunlight is from the beginning of April until the middle of October, with the end of August being the least covered season, reaching up to 70% of the open sky. The rest of the year tends to be more hazy, with mid-January reaching 77% of the overcast sky. The duration between the shortest day of the year and the longest day usually coincide correctly with the astronomical cycles. The second annual semester is usually season of stronger winds, mainly between September and October with average winds of 8 km/h. The quietest time is between February and March with average speeds of 6 km/h. The predominant direction of the north winds is around 2/3 of the year, mainly between the end of April and the end of September. In almost 4 months the second major direction is from the east.

Gallery

References

External links

  Official Campos do Jordão website
  Official Campos do Jordão and Region Convention & Visitors Bureau
  Buscacamposdojordao.com: Search engine exclusively for Campos do Jordão
  NetCampos - Commercial site with quality useful information
  Blog Campos do Jordão
  Mapadecamposdojordao.com: Google map of Campos do Jordão — with some locales indicated.
  EncontraCamposdoJordão - Find everything about Campos do Jordão
 Campos Listagem - all about Campos do Jordão
 Guia Vale do Paraíba - O que fazer em Campos do Jordão

 
German-Brazilian culture